Congregation Talmud Torah Adereth El, or Adereth El for short, is an Orthodox Jewish synagogue located at 133 East 29th Street, New York City, New York USA.  Founded in 1857, it claims to be the oldest synagogue in its original location with continuous services at the same location.

History
The Adereth El synagogue was founded by German Jewish immigrants in the fall of 1857.  The synagogue opened a building on its current site on 29th Street in 1863, having purchased the lot for $5,000.  The present building, is the result of a 1945 renovation by architect Gustave Iser, followed by a 1994 renovation that "left little of the facade except the Star of David".

Rabbis

Before he died in June 2013 at 100 years of age, Rabbi Sidney Kleiman was both the longest-serving and oldest active congregational rabbi in the United States.  Rabbi Kleiman served as the congregation's rabbi since 1939 until 1996, when Rabbi Gideon Shloush joined the synagogue and Rabbi Kleiman became rabbi emeritus.

Congregation
Adereth El's current membership reflects the diversity of its neighborhood, Murray Hill.  During the work week, many Jewish businessmen with nearby offices pray at the synagogue. Of note, many Adereth El members are students and faculty at the nearby New York University (NYU) medical center.  The synagogue's proximity to the hospital also brings in many hospital patients’ visitors as guests at Adereth El services.  In fact, the synagogue typically has multiple weekly baby-naming ceremonies due to the large number of labor and delivery visitors.  Additionally, due to Adereth El's location near Yeshiva University’s Stern College for Women, many Stern students regularly attend the synagogue's services.

In 2007, the congregation marked its 150th anniversary with a series of celebrations.  A lecture series highlighted the history of Jews in New York City.  A gala dinner was held at the Battery Gardens Restaurant in Battery Park in March.

See also

Oldest synagogues in the United States

References

External links

 Synagogue website

German-Jewish culture in New York City
Religious organizations established in 1857
Synagogues in Manhattan
Orthodox synagogues in New York City
1857 establishments in New York (state)